(Tell, my tongue), WAB 33, is a sacred motet composed by Anton Bruckner in 1868. It is a setting of the Latin hymn Pange lingua for the celebration of Corpus Christi.

History 
Bruckner composed the motet on 31 January 1868 at the end of his stay in Linz. Bruckner’s original intention was to have it performed at the same time as the first performance of his Mass in E minor for the dedication of the votive chapel in Linz, the first part of the New Cathedral. Bruckner heard his work only twenty years later. The manuscript of the motet is archived at the 'Österreichische Nationalbibliothek.

Franz Xaver Witt was a leader of the Cecilian Movement, aiming to restore Catholic church music "to the purity and comparative simplicity of the Palestrinian style". In 1885 he asked Bruckner for a composition to be included in Musica sacra (Regensburg), the movement's journal, in which he issued a transcription of the motet. Witt modified the alto part without Bruckner's agreement, removing "some of the work's more daring harmonies". Ten years later, in 1895, the motet was published in its original setting by Johann Groß, Innsbruck.

Music 
The work is a setting of 38 bars in Phrygian mode of the first and last two verses (Tantum ergo) of the Pange lingua for mixed choir a cappella. A 3-bar Amen was added later.

The work, which is composed in the old church mode, begins in unison and evolves via an empty fifth to perfect chords. Max Auer commented: The whole work has much mystic atmosphere and, despite its great simplicity, I would regard it as one of Bruckner's best sacred compositions ("").

Selected discography 
The first recording occurred in 1965:
 Giulio Bertola,  Coro Polifonico Italiano – LP: Angelicum LPA 5989

A selection among the about 30 recordings of the work:
 Eugen Jochum, Chor des Bayerischen Rundfunks, Messe Nr. 2 e-Moll, 2 Motetten – LP: LP: DG 2530 139, 1966
 Joachim Martini, Junge Kantorei, Geistliche Chormusik der Romantik – LP: Schwarzwald MPS 13004, 1970
 George Guest, St. John's College Choir Cambridge, The World of St. John's 1958–1977 – LP: Argo ZRG 760, 1973
 Hans-Christoph Rademann, NDR Chor Hamburg, Anton Bruckner: Ave Maria – Carus 83.151, 2000
 Dan-Olof Stenlund, Malmö Kammarkör, Bruckner: Ausgewählte Werke – CD: Malmö Kammarkör MKKCD 051, 2004
 Stephen Layton, Polyphony Choir, Bruckner: Mass in E minor & Motets – CD: Hyperion CDA 67629, 2007
 Marcus Creed, SWR Symphony Orchestra and Stuttgart-Radio Vocal Ensemble, Mass in E minor and Motets – CD: Hänssler Classic SACD 93.199, 2007
 Erwin Ortner, Arnold Schoenberg Chor, Anton Bruckner: Tantum ergo – CD: ASC Edition 3, issue of the choir, 2008
 Duncan Ferguson, Choir of St. Mary's Cathedral of Edinburgh, Bruckner: Motets  – CD: Delphian Records DCD34071, 2010
 Philipp Ahmann, MDR Rundfunkchor Leipzig, Anton Bruckner & Michael Haydn - Motets – SACD: Pentatone PTC 5186 868, 2021

References

Sources 
 Max Auer, Anton Bruckner als Kirchenmusiker, G. Bosse, Regensburg, 1927
 Anton Bruckner – Sämtliche Werke, Band XXI: Kleine Kirchenmusikwerke, Musikwissenschaftlicher Verlag der Internationalen Bruckner-Gesellschaft, Hans Bauernfeind and Leopold Nowak (Editor), Vienna, 1984/2001
 Cornelis van Zwol, Anton Bruckner 1824–1896 – Leven en werken, uitg. Thoth, Bussum, Netherlands, 2012. 
 Crawford Howie, Anton Bruckner – A documentary biography, online revised edition
 John Williamson (ed.): The Cambridge Companion to Bruckner Cambridge University Press, 2004,

External links 
 
 
 Pange lingua et Tantum ergo phrygisch, WAB 33 Critical discography by Hans Roelofs 
 A live performance by the Concordia Chamber Choir can be heard on YouTube: Pange lingua, WAB 33

Motets by Anton Bruckner
1868 compositions